FC Sapovnela Terjola is a defunct Georgian association football club from the town of Terjola.

Sapovnela was a municipal club, financially supported by the local municipality up until the 2016 season and by Georgian Football Development Foundation during the next two years.  

Overall, they have spent three seasons in Umaglesi Liga, the Georgian top division.

Sapovnela formally ceased to exist in May 2019.

History
Sapovnela made a debut in the Pirveli Liga competition in 1990. After three seasons they came 3rd and gained promotion to Umaglesi Liga, where the club stayed for two years.

In 2013, Sapovnela finished in the third place in Liga 3 and returned to Pirveli Liga with ambitious plans to advance further to the top flight. This goal was implemented the next season. Under head coach Mirian Getsadze the team sealed the title with seven matches to spare 23 points clear of their rivals. Striker Giorgi Bukhaidze became a top scorer of B Group with 16 goals.

Bukhaidze shined in the top league as well by scoring 15 of the overall 24 team goals. Sapovnela signed experienced field players Davit Odikadze, Aleksandre Koshkadze, Jaba Dvali and fought hard to stay up. Zviad Jeladze was appointed as a manager midway through this season following unsatisfactory results, but the club was inundated with problems. Since their home ground was announced unfit for hosting the league games, they hired pitches in neighbouring cities such as Zestafoni and Kutaisi. Lacking financial resources and home supporters, Sapovnela were fined by the Federation with 5,000₾ for crowd disturbances, followed by 7,000 for verbal insults directed at referees and further 1,000 for setting off flares. The club was also ordered to hold one game behind closed doors. Besides, their officials made complaints about a biased approach from referees. 

Had Sapovnela prevailed over Chikhura in a final dramatic match of this season, they might have avoided relegation, although after a 3–2 loss they ended up bottom of the table.       

Likewise, a bitter survival battle lasted until the last day in Pirveli Liga the next year. Having lost a crunch game again, the team finished in the drop zone. 

Their 2017 season in Liga 3 was dismal. With two wins in 36 games, Sapovnela showed the worst results among the participant clubs and suffered a third successive relegation. 

Beset by financial difficulties, they were no longer able to took part in Regionuli Liga. In March 2018, they withdrew from the league. A year later the Kutaisi City Court declared Sapovnela bankrupt.

Seasons

Honours
Pirveli Liga

 Third place (2): 1992-93, 2015-16Meore Liga Winners''' (1): 2012-13

Players

References

External links
Profile On Soccerway

Football clubs in Georgia (country)
FC Sapovnela Terjola
FC Sapovnela Terjola
Defunct football clubs in Georgia (country)